Teresa Gutiérrez (born January 6, 1951) is an American activist. Gutiérrez was the Workers World Party nominee for Vice President of the United States in the 2004. She was the running mate of John Parker. Besides the World Workers Party, the Parker/Gutiérrez ticket was also endorsed by the Liberty Union Party of Vermont.

Gutiérrez is a co-coordinator of the International Action Center and a member of the governing body of the WWP. She is deputy secretary general of the International Migrant Alliance, an active member of the Chican@ movement and activist for immigrant rights, and a "proud lesbian."

Bibliography
 Free Trade, Monopoly & Nafta - Libre Comercio, Los Monoplios Y El Tlc (1993)  (with Sam March)
 War In Colombia: Made In USA (2004)  (editor with Sara Flounders)

References

1951 births
Living people
American politicians of Mexican descent
Lesbian politicians
American LGBT politicians
2004 United States vice-presidential candidates
21st-century American politicians
Workers World Party vice presidential nominees
Hispanic and Latino American women in politics
Female candidates for Vice President of the United States
21st-century American women politicians